Drummartin is a town in northern Victoria, Australia. The town is in the City of Greater Bendigo, located between Elmore and Raywood.

History
Drummartin is the birthplace of Hugh Victor McKay (1865-1926), the inventor of the first commercially viable combine harvester. McKay was educated at Drummartin primary school by his father until the age of thirteen. McKay's father, Nathaniel McKay, moved to Victoria in 1852.

McKay was the fifth child of twelve, and the son of immigrants from Monaghan in Ulster. This suggests that the etymology of Drummartin is likely to be Irish, and may come from either the hamlet of Drummartin in County Sligo or from Drummartin in southern Dublin.

See also
 Elmore
 Raywood

References

External links

Towns in Victoria (Australia)
Bendigo
Suburbs of Bendigo